General Donovan may refer to:

Edward Westby Donovan (1821–1897), British Army lieutenant general
Francis L. Donovan (fl. 1980s-2020s), U.S. Marine Corps major general
William J. Donovan (1883–1959), U.S. Army major general, wartime head of the Office of Strategic Services (OSS)
General Donovan Department, a department of Chaco Province in Argentina named for General Antonio Donovan